N-Methylmescaline is a phenethylamine isolated from Lophophora williamsii.

References

Phenethylamine alkaloids
Secondary amines
Methoxy compounds